Aerenea bimaculata is a species of beetle in the family Cerambycidae. It was described by Juan Brèthes in 1920. It is known from Peru and Bolivia.

References

Compsosomatini
Beetles described in 1920
Taxa named by Juan Brèthes